Spanish is the de facto official and administrative language of Chile. Spoken by 99.3% of the population in the form of Chilean Spanish, as well as Andean Spanish and Chilean Catalan, Spanish in Chile also receives the title of "castellano." Although an officially recognized Hispanic language does not exist at the governmental level, the Constitution itself- as well as all official documents- is written in this language. 

Indigenous peoples make up 4.58% of the Chilean population according to the 2002 Census, and the major languages of the population are as follows: Mapuche is spoken by an estimated 100,000-200,000 people; Aymara by 20,000 individuals; Quechua by 8,200 individuals; and Rapa Nui by 3,390 people. However, it is not explicit if the above-mentioned speakers use these as their primary language. 

According to Law 19253, also known as "The Indigenous Law" (1993), indigenous languages are officially recognized for use and conservation, as well as Spanish, in the zones in which they are spoken. They can be used for instruction, the promotion of media communication, as names in the Civil Registry, as well as artistic and cultural promotion. 

Bilingual programs in areas occupied by indigenous communities are also under development. However, these programs exist only as small, isolated projects dedicated to the maintenance and promotion of indigenous languages, specifically Mapuche and Aymara, both with varying degrees of success.

Indigenous languages of Chile 
In Chile, there are 15 different linguistic dialects spoken that could be considered distinct languages. These languages are varied, and in Chile-- unlike other Southern American countries-- no large linguistic family exists. Therefore, all indigenous languages are isolated or belong to small families of three or four languages.

Indigenous Languages Currently Spoken 

 Mapuche: Mainly spoken in the Biobío, Aracuanía, Metropolitan, and Los Ríos regions by around 100,000 to 200,000 people with different levels of linguistic competency. The Chesungun or Huilliche dialect, spoken by only 2,000 Huilliche people in the Los Lagos region, is a divergent dialect that some experts consider a distinct language from Mapuche. 718,000 people of a total Chilean population of 17,574,003 are Mapuche.
 Aymara: Spoken by 20,000 people in the Arica and Parinacota regions of Tarapacá. It is close to Bolivian Aymara.

 Chilean Quechua, one of the varieties of Southern Quechua: Considered identitical to Sub-Bolivian, it is spoken by around 8,200 people in the region between Antofagasta and Bolivia.Within the Peruvian immigrants residing in established big cities, there are also speakers of distinct Quechuan dialects of Peru.
 Rapa Nui: Used by only 3,390 speakers, majority of speakers are of Easter Island, and a few reside in continental cities like Valparaíso or Santiago.

Indigenous Languages in Danger of Extinction 

 Kawésqar: Spoken by a dozen people in Puerto Edén.

Extinct Indigenous Languages 

 Cacán: The language was spoken by the Diaguita Pueblo in the North region of Chile.
 Chono: It is conserved in one linguistic registry and is connected to Chiloé and the Guaitecas Islands; it may have been a northern dialect of Kawésqar.
 Gününa këna: Spoken by the Gününa küne or Puelche people.
 Kunza: Spoken by the Atacameño people around San Pedro de Atacama. It disappeared during the 20th century, and only a few hundred words are remembered. Currently, work is being done to recover it.
 Ona: Spoken by the Selk'nam people on the island of Tierra del Fuego, this language disappeared in Chile during the 20th century, and in Argentina during the 21st century.
 Tehuelche: Spoken by the Aonikenk or Tehuelches people, this language disappeared in Chile during the 20th century and is dwindling in Argentina. Extinct in 2019.

 Yaghan: In Puerto Williams, Cristina Calderón, died in 2022, was the last speaker. Calderón created the dictionary for the continuation and survival of the Yaghan language.

Classification of Indigenous Languages 
The native languages of Chile belong to four or five linguistic families. In addition, half a dozen other languages are known, including isolated and unclassified languages, many of which are extinct today (indicated by the sign †). The following list includes more than a dozen indigenous languages amongst living languages and extinct languages in the country:

See also: Anexo:Lenguas indígenas de América

Non-indigenous languages spoken by distinct communities or immigrants 

 German: maintained by the descendants of German immigrants who arrived in the south in the mid-19th century, mainly standard High German (acquired through education), but also vernacular forms such as German dialects from the shores of Lake Llanquihue.

 Haitian Creole: used by the Haitian community.

 Croatian: spoken by Croatian immigrant communities, especially in the south of the country.
 English: spoken by immigrants and their descendants.
 Italian: spoken within the Italian immigrant community.

 Romani: Spoken by the Romani people.
 Chilean Sign Language: Used by the country's Deaf community.

References 

 Lewis, M. Paul; Gary F. Simons y Charles D. Fennig (eds.) (2009). «Ethnologue report for Chile». Ethnologue: Languages of the World (en inglés) (16th Edition) (Dallas, Texas: SIL International). Accessed October 29, 2009.
 Moreno Fernández, Francisco, y Jaime Otero Roth (2006). «2. Demolingüística del dominio hispanohablante - 2.5 Demografía del español en el mundo hispánico»(PDF). Demografía de la lengua española. pp. 20-21. Consultado el 12 de noviembre de 2011.
 Sáez Godoy, Leopoldo (2001). «El dialecto más austral del español: fonética del español de Chile». II Congreso internacional de la lengua española. Unidad y diversidad del español(Valladolid). Consultado el 9 de abril de 2011.
 Cavada, Francisco J. (1914). «Estudios lingüísticos». Chiloé y los chilotes. Santiago: Imprenta Universitaria. pp. 448.
 Instituto Nacional de Estadísticas (INE) (marzo de 2003). «Censo 2002: Síntesis de resultados» (PDF). www.ine.cl.
 Zúñiga, Fernando (2006). «Los mapuches y su lengua». Mapudungun. El habla mapuche. Santiago: Centro de Estudios Públicos. p. 402. 
 Albó, Xavier. «Aymaras entre Bolivia, Perú y Chile». Estudios atacameños(Antofagasta: Universidad Católica del Norte) (19): 43-73.
 Ministerio de Planificación y Cooperación (MIDEPLAN) (5 de octubre de 1993). «Ley 19253 de 1993 del Ministerio de Planificación y Cooperación» (HTML). Consultado el 24 de abril de 2011. «El Estado reconoce como principales etnias indígenas de Chile a: la Mapuche, Aimara, Rapa Nui o Pascuenses, la de las comunidades Atacameñas, Quechuas y Collas del norte del país, las comunidades Kawashkar o Alacalufe y Yámana o Yagán de los canales australes».
 Language of the land: The politics of ... - kb.osu.edu. (n.d.). Retrieved November 1, 2021, from https://kb.osu.edu/bitstream/handle/1811/87588/GutmannFuentesAndrea_Thesis.pdf.
 Lewis, M. Paul (ed.) (2009). «Ethnologue report for language code: ayr - Aymara, Central». Ethnologue: Languages of the World (en inglés) (16.ª edición) (Dallas, Texas: SIL International). Consultado el 9 de mayo de 2012.
 Wagner, Claudio (Septiembre de 2006). «Sincronía y diacronía en el habla dialectal chilena». Estudios Filologicos. . Consultado el 28 de diciembre de 2016.
 De Ruyt, Felipe (19 de abril de 2015). «Capacitan en idioma créole a matronas para atender a creciente población haitiana migrante» (HTML). El Mercurio On-Line. Consultado el 9 de noviembre de 2015.
 Zlatar Montan, Vjera (2005). Los croatas, el salitre y Tarapacá (PDF) (2.ª edición). Iquique: Hrvatski Dom. p. 286. . Consultado el 22 de abril de 2012.
 «La inmigración italiana». Ciudad de Valparaíso. 2008. Archivado desde el original el 7 de julio de 2011. Consultado el 27 de marzo de 2011.

External links 
 Ethnologue: Chile
 Chilean Slang… from A to Z – This is Chile
 Chilean Expressions – This is Chile